Jhonatan Rivas Mosquera (born 11 July 1998) is a Colombian weightlifter, Pan American Champion and Pan American Games Champion competing in the –94 kg category until 2018 and 96 kg starting in 2018 after the International Weightlifting Federation reorganized the categories.

Career
He won the silver medal at the 2018 Junior World Weightlifting Championships in the 94 kg division, and most recently competed at the 2018 World Weightlifting Championships in the 96 kg division.

He competed at the 2019 Pan American Weightlifting Championships in the 96 kg category, winning gold medals in every lift, outlifting the silver medalist by 19 kg.

Major results

References

1998 births
Living people
Colombian male weightlifters
Pan American Games medalists in weightlifting
Pan American Games gold medalists for Colombia
Weightlifters at the 2019 Pan American Games
Medalists at the 2019 Pan American Games
Pan American Weightlifting Championships medalists
21st-century Colombian people